Nocrich railway station was a station on the Agnita railway line in Nocrich, Sibiu County, Romania. The station still exists along with the track, which has been protected.

History
The station was built by the Hungarian State Railways in 1910, which operated it until 1919 when Transylvania became part of Romania. After a decline in usage across the whole line and subsequent curtailing of the route in the 1960s and 1990s, the station closed in 2001.

Future
Plans exist to reopen part of the line after it was protected in 2008. The local group Asociația Prietenii Mocăniței has taken on the task of restoring the route which has already restored a section of the line.

References

Defunct railway stations in Romania
Former Agnita railway line stations
Railway stations opened in 1910
Railway stations closed in 2001
1910 establishments in Austria-Hungary
2001 disestablishments in Romania